Jason Smith (born 31 May 1984) is an Australian actor, writer and singer best known for his roles in Home and Away and Power Rangers Jungle Fury.

Early life and education
Smith was born in Sydney and he studied at the Australian Theatre for Young People. When he was thirteen, Smith landed a role on Water Rats. After he completed high school, Smith chose to pursue a career in acting. He appeared in All Saints, Ocean Star and an American telemovie called The Mystery of Natalie Wood.

Career 
Smith appeared as Robbie Hunter on the Australian soap opera Home and Away from 2003 until 2006. Smith earned a nomination for "Most Popular New Male Talent" at the 2005 Logie Awards for his role as Robbie.

Smith played Casey Rhodes, the Red Ranger, in Power Rangers Jungle Fury. He then starred as Gryff in Legend of the Seeker. Smith presented the first season of the Australian children's educational show Backyard Science. He also starred as a pied piper in a commercial for Axe. Smith appeared on the Australian game shows Talkin' 'Bout Your Generation and the Australian version of Pyramid.

In 2008, Smith released three songs; "What Planet", "Celebrity" and "Where".

In 2012, Smith wrote an episode of the soap opera 'Home and Away', which he had previously starred in.

In 2014, Smith reprised his role as Casey Rhodes on an episode of Power Rangers Super Megaforce titled "Spirit of the Tiger" and he also wrote the episodes Blue Saber Saga, Samurai Surprise, Power of Six and All Hail Prince Vekar of the same show.

In January 2016, Smith joined Nova FM to host Late Nights across the network. He resigned from Nova FM in December 2016 to focus on his acting career.

He had also returned briefly to Power Rangers as the voice of Brineblast in Power Rangers Dino Fury.

Filmography

Film

Television

References

External links

 
 Official website

1984 births
Australian television presenters
Australian male child actors
Australian male soap opera actors
Male actors from Sydney
Living people

Jason Smith